{{Infobox football club 
| clubname = Békéscsaba
| image    = Bekescsaba-Elore.png
| upright = 0.7
| fullname = Békéscsaba Előre
| nickname = Lilák (Purples) 
| founded  =  
| ground   = Kórház utcai Stadion,Békéscsaba 
| capacity = 4,963 
| chairman = Károly Királyvári
| manager  = Gábor Brlázs
| league   = NB II
| season   = 2021–22
| position = NB II, 15th
| pattern_la1=_whitelines
| pattern_b1=_thinwhitesides
| pattern_ra1=_whitelines
| pattern_sh1 = _adidaswhite
| pattern_so1 = _3_stripes_on_white_top
| leftarm1=4B0082
| body1=4B0082
| rightarm1=4B0082
| shorts1=4B0082
| socks1=4B0082
| pattern_la2=_blacklines
| pattern_b2=_thinpurplesides
| pattern_ra2=_blacklines
| pattern_sh2 = _adidasonwhite
| pattern_so2 = _3_stripes_black
| leftarm2=FFFFFF
| body2=FFFFFF
| rightarm2=FFFFFF
| shorts2=000000
| socks2=FFFFFF
}}

Békéscsaba 1912 Előre is a Hungarian football club from Békéscsaba. The club was founded in 1912 as Előre Munkás Testedző Egyesület. The colours of the club are lilac and white. The club achieved its greatest success in 1988 when it won the Hungarian Cup competition, defeating Budapest Honvéd FC 3–2 in the final.

Until the end of 2004–05 the club spent a total of 25 seasons in the first Hungarian division, the Nemzeti Bajnokság I. They were promoted back to the top tier in 2015.

Name changes

 1912: Békéscsabai Előre Munkás Testedző Egyesület 1948: Békéscsabai Előre SC 1970: Békéscsabai Előre Spartacus SC 1991: Békéscsabai Előre FC,
 2005: Békéscsaba 1912 Előre SEStadium

Békéscsabai Előre play at the Kórház utcai Stadion situated in Békéscsaba, Hungary. Its capacity is 4,963 and it was built in 1974.

Current squadAs of 26 January 2023.''

Honours
Hungarian Cup
 Winners (1): 1987–88

Seasons

European Cup history

UEFA Cup Winners' Cup

UEFA Intertoto Cup

UEFA Cup

Best Player Ever 
|
|
|
Ivan Nedkov - Bulgarian Number 8

References

External links

1912elore.hu Website
Stormcorner – Békéscsaba fans' website

 
Football clubs in Hungary
Association football clubs established in 1912
1912 establishments in Hungary